Srikakulam road railway station (station code:CHE) is an Indian Railways station in Amadalavalasa town of Andhra Pradesh. It lies on the Khurda Road–Visakhapatnam section of Howrah–Chennai main line and is administered under Waltair railway division of  South Coast Railway zone.

Structure and amenities 
The station has four platforms and all the tracks are broad gauge and electrified. Almost all platforms are in same size. The station has two entrance terminals: one at Amadalavalasa town end other in Mettakkivalasa region equipped with reservation counters and has bus facility to the nearby city Srikakulam and other towns. APSRTC provides every 20 minute bus facility from Srikakulam Road railway station to Srikakulam city. After creation of new zone Srikakulam station be First & Last Major station in Howrah -Chennai mainline towards north. There is a demand for New station to built in Srikakulam town by local people.

History 
The southern part was subsequently merged with Madras and Southern Mahratta Railway then with East Coast Railway  zone of Indian Railways came into existence in its present form with effect from 1 April 2003. and then with  South Coast Railway  zone of Indian Railways came into existence in its present form with effect from 27 Feb 2019.

Reorganization 
The Bengal Nagpur Railway was nationalized in 1944.Eastern Railway was formed on 14 April 1952 with the portion of East Indian Railway Company east of Mughalsarai and the Bengal Nagpur Railway. In 1955, South Eastern Railway was carved out of Eastern Railway. It comprised lines mostly operated by BNR earlier. Amongst the new zones started in April 2003 were East Coast Railway, South East Central Railway. Both these railways were carved out of South Eastern Railway.  South Coast Railway was carved out of East Coast Railway and South Central Railway on 27 feb 2019.

Electrification
The Palasa–Tilaru, Srikakulam Road–Chiprupalle and Chirupalle–Alamanda sectors were electrified in 1998–99. The Srikakulam Road–Tilaru sector was electrified in 1999–2000.

Classification 

Srikakulam Road railway station is classified as an A–category station with Non suburban Group -4 category in the Waltair railway division.

Trains which are operated from this station 

There are Special trains in Festival times which operated by South Central railway from Srikakulam to Secunderabad, Tirupati. A MEMU train services starts from This station to Palasa and Visakhapatnam. New private train to Hyderabad (Charlapalli) starts from this station.

See also 

 Waltair railway division
 East Coast Railway zone

References

Railway stations in Srikakulam district
Srikakulam
Railway stations in Waltair railway division